This is a discography for Old Europa Cafe records.

 Il Sogno Mediterraneo Di - De Fabriek OECD 001 (1985)
 Manifesto Industriale Italiano - Various Artist 4X Cassette OEC 100
 Aurora - Ain Soph CD OECD 053 & OECD 053-X (2003)
 A Silent Siege - Deutsch Nepal CD  OECD 045 (2002)
 The Berlin Requiem - Autopsia OECD 084 (2006)
 The Impossibility of Silence - Black Sun Productions double CD  OECD 086 (2006)
 Via Occulta - Dead Man's Hill CDr OECDR 037 (2009)
 The Sun - Brume CD OECD 109 (2008)
 Siege (1999-2009) - Death Pact International CD, Comp + Box, Ltd OECD 108 (2009)
 Emergence & Immersion - Voice Of Eye CDx2 OECD 123 (2009)
 Laetitia - Circus Joy CD OECD 124 (2009)
 Suicide Box - Djinn 3CDr OECDR 038 (2009)
 Supernova - Satanismo Calibro 9 CDr OECDR 039 (2009)
 PanAeonic Glyphs - Aossic S'lba CDr OECDR 040 (2009)
 VI Congresso Post Industriale - Various Artist CD OECD 115 (2009)
 Evolution - Nordvargr CDx2 OECD 116 (2009)
 Tetraphobia - K. Meizter CD OECD 117 (2009)
 Pain Implantations - Stratvm Terror CD OECD118 (2009)
 Tempus Null - Gnomonclast CD OECD 125 & OECD 125/SE (2010)
 Ortodox - Folkstorm CD OECD 126 (2010) 
 VII Congresso Post Industriale - Various Artist CD OECD 127 (2010)
 Experimentum Solaris -Watch CD OECD 128 (2010)
 Ere I Perish - Luftwaffe CD OECD 129 (2010)
 2012 - John Zewizz CD OECD 130 (2010)
 Marmo - Merzbow CD OECD 131 (2010)
 Mr. Nightbird Hates Blueberries - Albireon CD OECD 132 (2010)
 Ready For 69 -Dead Body Love / Toby Dammit / Splinter Vs. Stalin Fecalove Cassette OEC101 (2010)
 Misery Is A Shemale Lover - Satanismo Calibro 9 Cassette OEC 102 (2010)
 Kali Yuga A Go-Go - Teatro Satanico 10" single OEMP 015 (2010)

External links
 Official site

Record label discographies